The 2018–19 Louisiana Ragin' Cajuns women's basketball team represents the University of Louisiana at Lafayette during the 2018–19 NCAA Division I women's basketball season. The Ragin' Cajuns are led by seventh-year head coach Garry Brodhead and play all home games at the Cajundome along with the Louisiana Ragin' Cajuns men's basketball team. They were members in the Sun Belt Conference.

Previous season 
The Ragin' Cajuns finished the 2017–18 season 17-16, 10-8 in Sun Belt play to finish in a three-way tie for sixth place in the conference. They made it to the 2017-18 Sun Belt Conference Women's Basketball semifinal game after defeating the Georgia Southern Eagles 88-81 in 3 overtimes and the UT Arlington Mavericks 54-48. They lost in heartbreaking fashion against the Texas State Bobcats in the semifinals by the score of 56-62. The Ragin' Cajuns did not participate in post-season play.

Offseason

Incoming recruits

Roster

Schedule and results

|-
!colspan=9 style=| Exhibition
|-

|-
!colspan=9 style=| Non-conference regular season
|-

|-
!colspan=9 style=| Exhibition
|-

|-
!colspan=9 style=| Non-conference regular season
|-

|-
!colspan=9 style=| Conference regular season

|-
!colspan=9 style=| Sun Belt Women's Tournament

See also
 2018–19 Louisiana Ragin' Cajuns men's basketball team

References

Louisiana Ragin' Cajuns women's basketball seasons
Louisiana Ragin' Cajuns
Louisiana Ragin' Cajuns women's basketball